The WWF Intercontinental Tag Team Championship was a championship in the World Wrestling Federation (WWF, now WWE) during 1991. The belts were abandoned later in July 1991 when the WWF severed ties with UWF Japan.

Reigns

See also
 List of former championships in WWE
 Tag team championships in WWE

References

External links
WWE retired championship histories

Intercontinental professional wrestling championships
WWE tag team championships